Danilo Popivoda (1 May 1947 – 9 September 2021) was a  football player and manager.

On the international level he played for the Yugoslavia national team (20 matches and five goals) and was a participant at the 1974 FIFA World Cup. He also participated at the UEFA Euro 1976, where he scored a goal in a match against West Germany.

References 

1947 births
2021 deaths
People from North Bačka District
Yugoslav footballers
Association football forwards
Association football wingers
Yugoslavia international footballers
1974 FIFA World Cup players
UEFA Euro 1976 players
NK Olimpija Ljubljana (1945–2005) players
Eintracht Braunschweig players
Yugoslav First League players
Bundesliga players
2. Bundesliga players
Yugoslav expatriate footballers
Expatriate footballers in West Germany
Yugoslav expatriate sportspeople in West Germany
Slovenian people of Serbian descent
Slovenian football managers
NK Ljubljana managers